Christine McCarthy is an American businesswoman and the chief financial officer (CFO) of The Walt Disney Company. McCarthy reports to chief executive officer Bob Iger.

Education
McCarthy graduated from Smith College with a bachelor's degree in biology. She also earned an MBA in marketing and management from the Anderson School of Management at UCLA.

Career
Before joining Disney, McCarthy worked in the banking industry. From 1981 to 1996, McCarthy worked at First Interstate Bancorp in several finance and planning positions. She served as CFO and an executive vice president for Imperial Bancorp from 1997 to 2000. In 2000, she became treasurer of Disney. On June 30, 2015, McCarthy was appointed as the CFO of The Walt Disney Company replacing Jay Rasulo under a four-year contract with a base salary of $1.25 million with a potential 200% performance based bonuses and 250% long term incentive award. In 2021, she faced controversy when she suggested cutting food portion sizes at Disney's theme parks would benefit overweight Disney guests. On December 21, 2021, Disney announced they had renewed McCarthy's contract as CFO through 2024.

Philanthropy
McCarthy is a trustee for the Westridge School (Pasadena). She is also a mentor for the National Math and Science Initiative.

Awards
In 2015, McCarthy received the Woman of the Year Award from Treasury Today.

External links
The Walt Disney Company Profile

References

Disney executives
Living people
American chief financial officers
UCLA Anderson School of Management alumni
Smith College alumni
Women chief financial officers
Year of birth missing (living people)